Xavier Azuara Zúñiga (born 16 September 1979) is a Mexican politician affiliated with the PAN. He currently serves as Deputy of the LXII Legislature of the Mexican Congress representing San Luis Potosí.

References

1979 births
Living people
Politicians from San Luis Potosí
Members of the Chamber of Deputies (Mexico) for San Luis Potosí
Institutional Revolutionary Party politicians
21st-century Mexican politicians
Autonomous University of San Luis Potosi alumni
Members of the Congress of San Luis Potosí
Deputies of the LXII Legislature of Mexico
Deputies of the LXIV Legislature of Mexico
Deputies of the LXV Legislature of Mexico